i98FM (ACMA callsign: 2WIN) is a commercial radio station broadcasting on the FM band to the Illawarra region of New South Wales, Australia. It is owned by WIN Corporation, the parent company of WIN Television.

History
The station was born as 2OO ("2 Double 0") on 1 January 1979, broadcasting on 1575 kHz on the AM band. It often rated well behind popular rival commercial station, 2WL (now Wave FM), who had been broadcasting in the region since 1931. On 25 June 1992, 2OO converted to FM broadcasting and was relaunched as i98FM.

Since 1995, i98FM has consistently been the #1 radio station in the region (with the exception being two consecutive surveys in late 2002 and early 2003, when its main commercial rival, Wave FM, was the #1 station).

The station was broadcasting its own live coverage of Illawarra Steelers matches since the team's inception into the NSWRL competition in 1982. After the team merged with the St George Dragons during the 1998/99 off-season, the station continued to broadcast their own live coverage of St George Illawarra Dragons matches until 2001. In 2002, the live Dragons matches was axed in favour of the Continuous Call Team on relay from Sydney station 2GB, which aired on Sunday afternoons. That move contributed to i98FM's loss of the #1 position to Wave FM.

Notable on-air teams on i98FM over the years have included: Maroon & Milly (Breakfast), Alicia & Coastie (Breakfast), Marty & Erica (Breakfast), Marty, Erica & Stretto (Breakfast), Ryan Cram & Matt Smith ("The Shift" - night program), Marty & Bianca (Breakfast), Marty & Fairlie (Breakfast), Marty, Christie & Crammy (Breakfast), Maje & Fairlie (The Backseat - Drive program).

From October 2008 and into 2009, some big on-air changes happened at i98FM. Bianca Dye joined the Breakfast Show replacing Erica Hodge and Maje Saba and Fairlie Hamilton formed the first male/female duo team in Drive, called "The Backseat".  Ryan Cram moved from nights to Afternoons and Glenn "Stolzy" Stolzenhein moved from sister station C91.3FM nights to i98's night program, called "After Hours".  A weekend spot program called "Game On" was created and was hosted (until early 2012) by Tim "Robbo" Robinson.

From October 2008, i98FM began broadcasting programs that could also be heard on its Campbelltown sister station, C91.3. Ryan Cram's afternoon shift, along with networking 'The Backseat' and 'After Hours' between both stations.  This arrangement was mostly discontinued from January 2010, with "After Hours" the only i98FM program to be networked to C91.3 on weekdays.  From 2011, i98 stopped broadcasting programs to C91.3FM.

2012 saw the first major on-air changes to i98FM's lineup in 2–3 years. Fairlie Hamilton left "The Backseat" program, Lyndal Rogers took up the "After Hours" program after 6pm and Paul Glover took over the "Game On" sports program on weekends.  In 2013, Simon Anderson replaced Paul Glover as "Game On" host.

In 2015 Fairlie Hamilton returned to i98FM to co-host the Breakfast Show until 2017. In 2017 the Breakfast Show was restructured as 'Marty, Christie & Crammy' with the addition of former Home & Away actress Christie Hayes, while Ryan Cram joined breakfast from the Afternoon Show. In early 2020 When Christie Hayes left the show, she was replaced by Lyndal Rogers, who returned from C91.3 to form the current lineup of Marty, Crammy & Lyndal.

In November 2012, i98's major charity event, the annual "Camp Quality Convoy" raised over $1 million for Camp Quality charities in the Illawarra. The annual event held on the third Sunday of November continued to break its own fundraising records over the next three years. In 2015 Convoy raised $$1,725,057.00.

The i98FM Illawarra Convoy broadened its focus in 2016 with a new name and greater charitable reach. The region's biggest one-day fundraising event has been rebadged as the i98FM Illawarra Convoy to reflect its commitment to broaden the support to the Illawarra and South Coast community. The Illawarra Community Foundation was formed to assist with the distribution of funds raised to a range of local groups and individuals through a submission process.

In 2018 the i98FM Illawarra Convoy raised $2 million for the first time and in 2019 the event brought in a record $2,760,974.25.
Due to COVID-19 the 2020 vehicle convoy and Family Fun Day components of the event were replaced with a two-hour Convoy at Home television special, created by the WIN Network.

i98FM's Illawarra Convoy has also been recognised as ‘Best Community Service Project’ in the provincial category at the annual Australian Commercial Radio Awards (ACRA's) on numerous occasions. The event has won the award ten times in total, the first being in 2008 and then consecutively from 2010 – 2018.

In July 2021, it was announced that prominent i98 breakfast announcers Lyndal Rodgers and Ryan Cram would be leaving the breakfast show and moving to the competition, joining Wave FM to host a new drive show. Their show replaced the nationally syndicated Nova program Kate, Tim & Joel on Wave FM.

i98FM Current Announcers

 6am-9am: i98 Breakfast with Marty Christian McEwan and Annabella Leone
 9am-2pm: Workdays with Cam
 2pm-7pm: Drive Home with Maje
 7pm-9pm: Carrie & Tommy's Best Bits

Former announcers
Lyndal Rodgers (96.5 Wave FM's Lyndal and Crammy)
Ryan Cram (96.5 Wave FM's Lyndal and Crammy)
Josh Webster (C91.3FM)
Brendan Jones (WSFM's' Jonesy and Amanda)
Anthony Maroon (Triple M Sydney)
Erica Hodge (Southern Cross Austereo Perth)
Dave "Stretto" Stretton
Peter Hand
Matt Smith (Foxtel)
Glenn Stolzenhein
Tim "Robbo" Robinson (WIN Television Wagga Wagga)
Rod Poynter
Christian McEwan  (C91.3)
Mia Agius (KIIS 106.5)
Nicole Charlton
Marcus Paul (2SM)
Bianca Dye
Robert Kendell
George Ilich
Peter Kaye
Dean Matters
Fairlie Hamilton (ABC Illawarra)
Danielle Martin (Triple M Gold Coast)
Lachlan Kitchen
Christie Hayes
Justin Coombes-Pearce

References

Radio stations established in 1979
Radio stations in New South Wales
Hot adult contemporary radio stations in Australia
WIN Television